Shabbir Abad is a town of Jhang District, in Punjab, Pakistan, located on the Jhang Chiniot road.

Populated places in Jhang District
Jhang District